Kronprinsessegade 18 is a Neoclassical property overlooking Rosenborg Castle Garden in central Copenhagen, Denmark. The building was together with the adjacent buildings at No. 618 constructed by the master builder Johan Martin Quist. It was listed in the Danish registry of protected buildings and places in 1945.

History

Construction
Kronprinsessegade was created in 1802 on a strip of land that had until then been part of Rosenborg Castle Garden. The land had been presented to the City of Copenhagen by the Crown as partial compensation for a regulation of the city's street network following the Copenhagen Fire of 1795. A large plot of land was acquired by the master builder Johan Martin Quist (now No, 8-18).The site now known as Kronprinsessegade 18 was initially referred to as lots No. 1 and No. 2A. The still undeveloped property was listed in the new cadastre of 1806 as No. 391. The present building on the site was finally constructed by Qvist in 1807-13 as the last of his six Kronprinsessegade buildings.

Later history
The military officer P. F. Steinmann (1812-1894) resided in the building from 1847 to 1852. The civil servant and politician C. E. Bardenfleth (1807-1857) was among the residents in 1857. The  actress and ballet dancer Betty Hennings (née Schnell; 1850-1939) resided in the ground floor apartment from 1886 to 1890.

The writer Einar Christiansen (1861-1939) resided in the apartment on the third floor from 1891 until his death. He was editor of Illustreret Tidende from 1892 and artistic director of the Royal Danish Theatre from 1899.

Architecture

Kronprinsessegade 18 is constructed in four storeys over a raised cellar. The facade is horizontally divided by cornice bands below the first and fourth storey. There are relief decorations below the windows on the first floorstorey.

A perpendicular side wing extends from the rear side of the building and is again attached to a parallel cross wing at the bottom of the first courtyard. A gateway in the cross wing opens to the second courtyard. At the bottom of the second courtyard is a former wagon house.

The front wi ng, side wing and cross wing were kointly listed in the Danish registry of protected buildings and places in 1945. The wagon house is not part of the heritage listing.

Today
The building is today owned by Ejd. Kronprinsessegade 18.

References

External links

 1840 census
 1860

Listed residential buildings in Copenhagen
Neoclassical architecture in Copenhagen
Residential buildings completed in 1813
1813 establishments in Denmark